Liberia is a sub-Saharan nation in West Africa located at 6 °N, 9 °W. It borders the north Atlantic Ocean to the southwest ( of coastline) and three other African nations on the other three sides, Sierra Leone to the northwest, Guinea to the northeast and Ivory Coast (Côte d'Ivoire) to the east.

Physical geography

Drainage of the whole country is direct to the sea, with a series of short rivers flowing directly into the sea. These are, from west to east, the Mano River on the border with Sierra Leone, the Mafa River, the Lofa River, the Saint Paul River, the Mesurado River, the Farmington River, the Saint John River, the Timbo River, the Cestos River, the Sehnkwehn River, the Sinoe River, the Dugbe River, the Dubo River, the Grand Cess River and the Cavalla River on the border with Ivory Coast.

In the west, the coast is low and sandy, but in the central and eastern parts of the country it is sandy and rocky and of moderate relief, frequently broken by the mouths of the rivers. The coastal plain varies in width, being narrow between Monrovia and Buchanan, but being much wider in the west and in the Cestos Valley in the centre, narrowing again in the eastern end of the country.

This is divided by the river valleys and there are hilly ridges between some of the river valleys.

Extreme points 
This is a list of the extreme points of Liberia, the points that are farther north, south, east or west than any other location.

 Northernmost point – unnamed location on the border with Guinea in the Sodia river immediately north of the town of Voinjama, Lofa County.
 Easternmost point – unnamed headland at the confluence of the Cavally river and the Hana river, River Gee County.
 Southernmost point – Kablaké headland, Maryland County.
 Westernmost point -  unnamed headland immediately west of the town of Sewulu at the mouth of the Mano River, Grand Cape Mount County.

Borders and maritime claims

Terrain
Liberia has a mostly hilly terrain, it also has rolling plains along the coast to a rolling plateau and low mountains in the northeast.

Elevation extremes
The lowest point on Liberia is at sea level on the Atlantic Ocean.

Natural resources
Natural resources that are found in Liberia include iron ore, timber, diamonds, gold and hydropower.

Mining

Land use and agriculture
arable land:
5.2%
permanent crops:
2.1%
permanent pastures:
20.8%
forest:
44.6%
other:
27.3% (2011)

Irrigated land
30 square kilometres of Liberia's land was irrigated as of 2012.

Natural hazards
The natural hazard that occurs in Liberia is a dust-laden harmattan wind that blows from the Sahara (December to March).

Environmental issues

Climate change

See also 
 Administrative divisions of Liberia
 List of cities in Liberia
 List of rivers of Liberia
 List of Liberian national forests

References

External links